Cassino to Korea is a 1950 American documentary film directed by Eugene Genock. The film stars Quentin Reynolds, Jackson Beck, James W. Logan and David Ludlum. The film was released on October 3, 1950, by Paramount Pictures.

Plot

Cast 
Quentin Reynolds as Commentator
Jackson Beck as Commentator
James W. Logan as Sergeant James W. Logan
David Ludlum as Sergeant David Ludlum

References

External links 
 

1950 films
American documentary films
Paramount Pictures films
1950 documentary films
American black-and-white films
1950s English-language films
1950s American films